Candice Henrietta Scott (born 17 September 1980) is a track and field athlete who is a hammer throw specialist from Trinidad and Tobago.

Her personal best throw is 71.45 metres, achieved in May 2005 in Marietta, Georgia.

She attended the University of Florida in Gainesville, Florida, where she was a member of the Florida Gators track and field team.  She graduated from the university with a bachelor's degree in recreation in 2005.

Achievements

See also 

 Florida Gators
 List of University of Florida alumni
 List of University of Florida Olympians

References 

 

1980 births
Living people
Athletes (track and field) at the 2003 Pan American Games
Athletes (track and field) at the 2004 Summer Olympics
Athletes (track and field) at the 2008 Summer Olympics
Florida Gators women's track and field athletes
Olympic athletes of Trinidad and Tobago
Trinidad and Tobago hammer throwers
Female hammer throwers
Trinidad and Tobago female athletes
Pan American Games medalists in athletics (track and field)
Pan American Games bronze medalists for Trinidad and Tobago
Female weight throwers
Medalists at the 2003 Pan American Games
Athletes (track and field) at the 2002 Commonwealth Games
Commonwealth Games competitors for Trinidad and Tobago
Trinidad and Tobago shot putters